The John and Mary Jane Kyte Farmstead District is an agricultural historic district located northeast of Weldon, Iowa, United States.  At the time of its nomination it included four contributing buildings and four non-contributing buildings.  The significance of the district is attributed to its being a well
preserved early settlement era farmstead.  The contributing buildings include the 1856 Greek Revival house, the late 1850s or 1860s heavy timber frame barn, the chicken house, and the privy.  The district was listed on the National Register of Historic Places in 2000.

References

Greek Revival architecture in Iowa
Buildings and structures in Clarke County, Iowa
Historic districts on the National Register of Historic Places in Iowa
Farms on the National Register of Historic Places in Iowa
National Register of Historic Places in Clarke County, Iowa